Marko Jevtović may refer to:

 Marko Jevtović (table tennis) (born 1987), Serbian table tennis player
 Marko Jevtović (footballer) (born 1993), Serbian footballer